Adriana Pérez was the defending champion, having won the event in 2013, but chose not to participate.

An-Sophie Mestach won the title, defeating Lourdes Domínguez Lino in the final, 6–3, 7–5.

Seeds

Main draw

Finals

Top half

Bottom half

References 
 Main draw

Internacional Femenil Monterrey - Singles
Internacional Femenil Monterrey